The Eburovīcēs or Aulercī Eburovīcēs (Gaulish: *Eburouīcēs/Eburowīcēs, 'those who vanquish by the yew') were a Gallic tribe dwelling in the modern Eure department during the Iron Age and the Roman period. They were part of the Aulerci.

Name 

They are mentioned as Aulerci Eburovices by Caesar (mid-1st c. BC), Aulerci qui cognominantur Eburovices by Pliny (1st c. AD), and as Au̓lírkioioi̔ E̓bourouikoì (Αὐλίρκιοιοἱ Ἐβουρουικοὶ) by Ptolemy (2nd c. AD).

The Gaulish ethnonym *Eburouīcēs/Eburowīcēs literally means 'those who vanquish by the yew', probably in reference to the wood used to make their bows or spears. It stems from the root eburo- ('yew'; cf. OIr. ibar 'yew', or Middle Welsh efwr 'cow parsnip, hog-weed') attached to the suffix -uices ('combatants, victors').

The city of Évreux, attested ca. 400 AD as civitas Ebroicorum ('civitas of the Eburovices'; Ebroicas in 511, Ebroas ca. 1034), is named after the tribe.

Geography 
During the Roman period, their chief town was Mediolanum Aulercorum (modern Évreux, in Normandy). The limits of their civitas corresponded to those of the later diocese of Évreux.

Religion 
A votive altar with a dedication to a deus Gisacos was found in a sanctuary at Gisacum (Le Vieil-Évreux).

References

Bibliography

See also
Gallic Wars

 
Historical Celtic peoples
Gauls
Tribes of pre-Roman Gaul
Tribes involved in the Gallic Wars
History of Eure